Karen Loft Hess (November 11, 1918 – May 15, 2007) was an American culinary historian. Her 1977 book The Taste of America co-authored with her late husband, John L. Hess, established them as anti-establishment members of the culinary world.

Life and career

Born in Blair, Nebraska, she attended Humboldt State University in Arcata, California, where she majored in music.  Her husband was later a journalist (and for a short time in 1973–1974, food editor/critic) for The New York Times. Among their targets were celebrity chefs Craig Claiborne, James Beard and Julia Child. Hess sought to bring a historic rigor to cooking.  The New York Times said in her obituary: "Ms. Hess, known as a kind but combative personality, did not shrink from taking on the icons of American cookery, who she felt presented a false picture not only of the quality of American food and cooking but also of its history."

She encouraged the publication of—and wrote the introduction/historical notes for—a facsimile of the rare second edition of American Cookery (Applewood Books, 1996), the first known American cookbook, written by Amelia Simmons, and originally published in 1796.  She also annotated What Mrs. Fisher Knows About Old Southern Cooking (Applewood Books, 1995), one of the oldest known African-American cookbooks, originally published in 1881.

In 1985, Hess became one of the founding members of The Culinary Historians of New York, an association of food professionals, historians, and others interested in studying and writing on the history of food. On October 19, 2004, The Culinary Historians of New York presented her with their first annual Amelia Award, an award which recognizes excellence in culinary history.

In 2006, she was listed in the eighth annual Saveur 100, from Saveur magazine, in an article by Shane Mitchell entitled "The Grandest Dame of American Culinary History".  Mitchell says that although Hess came from Nebraska, her "soul must be Southern." Hess's The Carolina Rice Kitchen is the story of how rice from Africa became a South Carolina Low Country staple, as well as how the African cooks shaped Southern cooking.

Hess died in New York City (in Manhattan) after suffering a stroke the week before.

Bibliography

As annotator/editor
English Bread & Yeast Cookery, by Elizabeth David. American Edition with notes by Karen Hess, New York: Viking Press, 1980, 
Martha Washington's Booke of Cookery. Columbia University Press, 1981, 
Mary Randolph's 'Virginia Housewife'''. University of South Carolina Press, 1983, What Mrs. Fisher Knows About Old Southern Cooking Applewood Books, 1995, American Cookery by Amelia Simmons [1796], Applewood Books, 1996, The Art of Cookery Made Plain and Easy [1805] by Mrs. Hannah Glasse.  Facsimile edition annotated by Karen Hess, Applewood Books (1998) 

As authorThe Taste of America. University of Illinois Press, 1977,  Co-authored with John L. HessThe Carolina Rice Kitchen: The African Connection. University of South Carolina Press, 1992, 

References

External links
The Taste of America via University of Illinois Press
Karen Hess: A culinary giant's legacy Obituary by Damon Lee Fowler in the Savannah Morning News'', May 30, 2007 [Savannah, Georgia, USA]
What Mrs. Fisher Knows About Old Southern Cooking

1918 births
2007 deaths
Historians of the United States
American food writers
American people of Danish descent
20th-century American historians
American women historians
20th-century American women writers
People from Blair, Nebraska
21st-century American women